Drillia monodi is a species of sea snail, a marine gastropod mollusk in the family Drilliidae.

Description
Like most sea snails, this species has a shell used to surround and protect its soft body.

Distribution
This species is found in the demersal zone of the Atlantic Ocean off West Africa at a depth of 144 m.

References

  Tucker, J.K. 2004 Catalog of recent and fossil turrids (Mollusca: Gastropoda). Zootaxa 682:1–1295

External links

monodi
Gastropods described in 1952